Blastocladiella is a genus of fungus.

Species
 Blastocladiella anabaenae
 Blastocladiella asperosperma
 Blastocladiella britannica
 Blastocladiella colombiensis
 Blastocladiella cystogena
 Blastocladiella emersonii
 Blastocladiella laevisperma
 Blastocladiella microcystogena
 Blastocladiella novae-zelandiae
 Blastocladiella simplex
 Blastocladiella stomophilum
 Blastocladiella stuebenii
 Blastocladiella variabilis

External links
 Mycobank entry

Blastocladiomycota